The 2009 Hell in a Cell was the inaugural Hell in a Cell professional wrestling pay-per-view (PPV) event produced by World Wrestling Entertainment (WWE). It was held for wrestlers from the promotion's Raw, SmackDown, and ECW brand divisions. The event took place on October 4, 2009, at the Prudential Center in Newark, New Jersey. It replaced the previously annual October PPV, No Mercy. This was the only Hell in a Cell event to feature the ECW brand, as it was disbanded in February 2010.

Eight matches took place on the event's card. The event featured what was known as a supercard, which featured more than one main event match. The concept of the event was that each of these main event matches would be contested as Hell in a Cell matches. The main events included D-Generation X (Triple H and Shawn Michaels) defeating The Legacy (Cody Rhodes and Ted DiBiase), Randy Orton defeating John Cena to win the WWE Championship, and The Undertaker defeating CM Punk to win the World Heavyweight Championship. 

Other matches featured on the event were John Morrison defending the WWE Intercontinental Championship against Dolph Ziggler, Mickie James versus Alicia Fox for the WWE Divas Championship, Unified WWE Tag Team Champions Chris Jericho and Big Show versus Batista and Rey Mysterio, Drew McIntyre facing R-Truth, and a Triple Threat match for the WWE United States Championship among Kofi Kingston, The Miz, and Jack Swagger. This event would also be the final time Jim Ross called as part of WWE's commentary team full-time for a pay-per-view event and began part-time commentary onwards. The pay-per-view drew 283,000 buys, up from the 261,000 buys No Mercy 2008 received.

Production

Background 

In early 2009, World Wrestling Entertainment (WWE) ran a poll on their official website in which fans could vote on the name of that year's October pay-per-view (PPV), which would replace the previously annual October PPV, No Mercy. Hell in a Cell was chosen over No Escape, Locked Up, and Rage in a Cage. The concept of the show came from WWE's established Hell in a Cell match, in which competitors fight inside a 20-foot-high roofed cell structure surrounding the ring and ringside area and the main event match would be contested under the Hell in a Cell stipulation. The 2009 Hell in a Cell PPV was scheduled to be held on October 4, 2009, at the Prudential Center in Newark, New Jersey. It featured wrestlers from the Raw, SmackDown, and ECW brands.

Storylines 
The professional wrestling matches at Hell in a Cell featured professional wrestlers performing as characters in scripted events pre-determined by the hosting promotion, World Wrestling Entertainment (WWE). Storylines between the characters were produced on WWE's weekly television shows Raw, SmackDown, and ECW.

The main rivalry from the Raw brand was between D-Generation X (Triple H and Shawn Michaels) and The Legacy (Ted DiBiase and Cody Rhodes). Triple H and Shawn Michaels reformed their tag team unit D-Generation X at SummerSlam in a winning effort against Ted DiBiase and Cody Rhodes (collectively known as The Legacy). Their confrontations continued in the coming weeks before leading to a falls count anywhere match that can only be won by submission, which saw The Legacy get the victory. After one last major brawl between both teams the following night on Raw, it was announced later that night they would face one more time at the event in a Hell in a Cell match of their own.

The main rivalry from the SmackDown brand was between the World Heavyweight Champion CM Punk and The Undertaker. At Breaking Point, the two faced off in a submission match. Despite Undertaker successfully forcing Punk to submit with his Hell's Gate submission hold, SmackDown General Manager  Theodore Long declared that the hold had been banned "a long time ago" by Vickie Guerrero and restarted the match. Reminiscent of the Montreal Screwjob, Punk later locked in his Anaconda vise hold and despite Undertaker never submitting, Punk was declared the winner when referee Scott Armstrong called for the bell to be rang. On the September 18 episode of SmackDown, Undertaker kidnapped Long inside his limousine. Released from a casket a week later, a startled Long announced a reversal on the Hell's Gate ban and that a rematch between the two will take place at the event in a Hell in a Cell match.

Another rivalry from the Raw brand was between John Cena and Randy Orton over their vying for the WWE Championship; at SummerSlam, Orton had retained the title in a controversial fashion that saw him intentionally get disqualified before ultimately retaining the title; WWE owner, Vince McMahon, announced a rematch at Breaking Point; an "I Quit" match which was won by Cena. The following night on Raw, Orton received a rematch for the title from the night's guest matchmaker Trish Stratus at Hell in a Cell in the eponymous match. On the final Raw, Cena competed in a Gauntlet match against Chris Jericho, Big Show and Orton. After Cena defeated Jericho and Show by disqualification, Orton came out as the last opponent. However, the cell began to lower as Cena tried to stop Orton from escaping. Orton almost managed to get free but was too late, becoming trapped inside the cell with Cena. As Orton attempted to get away, Cena blocked the door and the two brawled. Orton managed to get out and began climbing to the top of the cell as Cena chased after him. With nowhere left to run, Cena attacked Orton with an Attitude Adjustment on top of the cell to close the show.

On the final SmackDown before Hell in a Cell, DX, Undertaker and Cena teamed up to face Legacy, Orton and Punk in an 8-man tag team match. Undertaker won the match for his team after executing a Tombstone Piledriver on Orton.

Dolph Ziggler continued his pursuit for the WWE Intercontinental Championship that he started in July when he won a triple threat match on the August 27 episode of WWE Superstars against Mike Knox and Finlay to become the number-one contender. A week later on SmackDown, John Morrison defeated Rey Mysterio to become the new Intercontinental Champion. The match between Ziggler and Morrison was originally set to take place at Breaking Point. However, the match was later postponed and subsequently announced to take place at Hell in a Cell instead.

Batista made his return to the company following a torn biceps brachii muscle and joined SmackDown, where he came into immediate conflict with Unified WWE Tag Team Champions Chris Jericho and The Big Show. After several confrontations with the team, Batista announced his contention for the titles at Hell in a Cell with partner Rey Mysterio.

Event

Preliminary matches
The first match was a Hell in a Cell match between CM Punk  and The Undertaker for the World Heavyweight Championship. Punk focused on Undertaker's leg in the early going. Punk hit Undertaker with a steel chair to score a near-fall. After Punk performed a step-up high knee in the corner, Undertaker executed a Last Ride to score a near-fall. Punk then attempted to hit Undertaker with the chair again but Undertaker countered with a big boot. Undertaker executed a chokeslam followed by a Tombstone Piledriver to win the title.

The next match featured John Morrison defending the Intercontinental Championship against Dolph Ziggler. Control of the match shifted between both superstars. Morrison missed the Starship Pain in the early part of the match, after which Ziggler dominated until Morrison countered a powerslam attempt into a DDT. Morrison then missed a Flying Chuck, after which Ziggler executed a German suplex. Ziggler attempted to delivered a Zig-Zag but Morrison held onto the ropes and delivered Starship Pain to retain the title.

Next was the Divas Championship match between defending champion Mickie James and Alicia Fox. James dominated most of the match before countering a bridge attempt by Fox into a Mickie-DDT to score the pinfall and retain the title.

The next match was between Jeri-Show (Chris Jericho and Big Show) and Batista and Rey Mysterio for the Unified WWE Tag Team Championship. The challengers dominated the early part of the match, isolating Jericho from his partner. Batista executed a spinebuster on Jericho to score a near-fall, after which Jericho executed a Codebreaker on Batista to score a near-fall. Big Show then performed a chokeslam on Batista but Mysterio broke the pinfall. Batista speared both Jericho and Big Show on the outside. Mysterio then executed a 619 on Big Show but was struck with a Knockout Punch while attempting a West Coast Pop. Big Show then pinned Mysterio to retain the titles.

Main event matches
The first main event match was a Hell in a Cell match for the WWE Championship between champion John Cena and Randy Orton. Both competitors had control at different points of the match. Cena used the cell to his advantage when he slammed Orton twice into the cell wall. When Cena attempted to slam Orton a third time, the challenger pushed him into the wall instead. Orton then attempted to drive Cena onto the steel steps but Cena bodyslammed the challenger to the outside. Orton then executed his middle-rope DDT for a near-fall. Cena followed with an Attitude Adjustment but Orton kicked out. Orton hit Cena on the neck with a steel chair, followed by a pin attempt which Cena kicked out. Cena applied the STF to Orton but Orton managed to get to the ropes. When Cena attempted another STF, Orton pushed him off, knocking the referee down in the process. Cena applied another STF and Orton tapped out, but the referee was unconscious at the time. After Cena checked on the referee, Orton executed an RKO but Cena kicked out. Orton then delivered a punt kick to win the title.

The next match featured R-Truth against Drew McIntyre. R-Truth executed a dropkick and leg lariat in the early going before McIntyre executed a big boot and a clothesline. McIntyre attempted twice to executed the Future Shock but Truth countered each one until McIntyre threw him from the top rope. McIntyre followed with the Future Shock to score the pinfall.

Next was a Triple Threat match for the United States Championship between champion Kofi Kingston, The Miz and Jack Swagger. Miz and Swagger worked together to deliver a double clothesline and double Irish whip to Kingston. Miz, however, attacked Swagger and executed his signature moves. Swagger hoisted Miz on his shoulders for an electric chair and Kingston executed a crossbody on Miz at the same time. Swagger delivered a belly-to-belly suplex on Kingston and covered him, but Miz broke the pin. Kingston afterwards performed a Boom Drop on Swagger but Miz broke up that pin too. Swagger attempted a German suplex on Miz but Kingston hit him with the Trouble in Paradise. Miz then delivered a Skull-Crushing Finale to Kingston, but Swagger put Kingston's foot on the rope. Swagger executed a gutwrench powerbomb on Miz after which Kingston executed another Trouble in Paradise on Swagger. Kingston then pinned Miz to retain his title.

The final match was a Hell in a Cell tag team match between D-Generation-X (Triple H and Shawn Michaels) and The Legacy (Cody Rhodes and Ted DiBiase). Rhodes and DiBiase attacked DX during their entrance which led to a brawl outside the cage before the match even started. Rhodes delivered a Cross Rhodes on the entrance ramp to Triple H. Legacy then put Michaels inside the cage and locked the door with HHH outside. Rhodes and DiBiase focused on Michaels' knee, performing knee breakers and ramming it into the steel post. HBK fought back, delivering an atomic drop, chops and Sweet Chin Music to DiBiase. However, Legacy continued to dominate Michaels as Triple H tried to break the lock with a chair. Triple H then left, seemingly abandoning HBK, but returned with pliers and opened the door, attacking Rhodes and DiBiase. Triple H then punched DiBiase using a chain and delivered a Pedigree on him, then left him outside the cage and locked the door. HHH and HBK finished Rhodes off with a sledgehammer/Sweet Chin Music combination to win the match. After the match, DiBiase entered the ring but was struck with a Sweet Chin Music, thus ending the show as DX celebrated their victory.

Aftermath
The 2009 Hell in a Cell event was the inaugural event of a now annual gimmick pay-per-view for WWE, generally held in October—the only exception being the September 2018 event,  June 2021 event and the June 2022 event. This inaugural event would be the only Hell in a Cell to feature ECW as the brand was disbanded in February 2010.

Results

Notes

References

External links
The official Hell in a Cell website

2009 in New Jersey
2009
Events in Newark, New Jersey
Professional wrestling in Newark, New Jersey
2009 WWE pay-per-view events
October 2009 events in the United States